Emil Fjellström (24 October 1884 – 14 July 1944) was a Swedish stage and film actor.

Early life and stage career
Emil Fjellström was born in Näs parish, Östersund Municipality, Jämtland County and grew up in the city of Östersund. After finishing school, he briefly worked at the post office before joining a local theater revue. He then decided to pursue theater acting as a professional career and debuted at Anton Salmson's Operetta Theatre in 1906. He would travel extensively through the country in various touring theater companies throughout the early 1900s and 1910s and enjoy a measure of popularity in the provinces.

Film career
Fjellström would make his film debut in the 1917 Gustaf Molander-penned, Mauritz Stiller-directed comedy Thomas Graals bästa film starring Victor Sjöström and Karin Molander, and appear in over 50 films between 1917 and his death in 1944. He was most often cast in comedic roles in film and character roles where he played rather stern but affectionate characters. Three films, 1945's Flickor i hamn, 1949's  Hur tokigt som helst, and 1952's Adolf i toppform would be released posthumously.

Return to the stage
While still appearing in films, he would eventually return to the stage in much larger roles at Stockholm's  Kristallsalongen, Berns Theatre, Folk Theatre and the Vanadislundens open air theater and the Municipal Theatre in Gothenburg in the 1930s.

Personal life
In 1913 Fjellström married stage and film actress Emilia "Millan" Fjellström (née Streiffert). The couple would remain married until his death in 1944 at age 59 in Stockholm, Sweden.

Selected filmography
His Lordship's Last Will (Swedish: Hans nåds testamente), 1919
Karin Daughter of Ingmar (Swedish: Karin Ingmarsdotter), 1920 
The Monastery of Sendomir (Swedish: Klostret i Sendomir), 1920
 Black Roses (Swedish: Svarta rosor), 1932
 International Match (Swedish: Landskamp), 1932
 What Do Men Know? (Swedish; Vad veta väl männen), 1933
 Secret Svensson (Swedish: Hemliga Svensson), 1933
 Simon of Backabo (Swedish: Simon i Backabo), 1934
 The People of Småland (Swedish: Smålänningar), 1935
 Shipwrecked Max (Swedish: Skeppsbrutne Max), 1936
 The Andersson Family  (Swedish: Familjen Andersson), 1937
 Adolf Strongarm (Swedish: Adolf Armstarke), 1937
 The Pale Count (Swedish: Bleka greven), 1937
 A Cruise in the Albertina (Swedish: På kryss med Albertina), 1938
 Comrades in Uniform (Swedish: Kamrater i vapenrocken), 1938
 Storm Over the Skerries (Swedish: Storm över skären), 1938
 Thunder and Lightning (Swedish: Blixt och dunder), 1938
 The Three of Us (Swedish: Vi tre), 1940
 A Real Man (Swedish: Karl för sin hatt), 1940
 Woman on Board (Swedish: En kvinna ombord), 1941
 Fransson the Terrible (Swedish: Fransson den förskräcklige), 1941
 Lasse-Maja, 1941
 The Ghost Reporter (Swedish: Spokreportern), 1941
 The Talk of the Town (Swedish: Det sags pa stan), 1941
 Tomorrow's Melody (Swedish: Morgondagens melodi), 1942
 The Heavenly Play (Swedish: Himlaspelet), 1942 
 Men of the Navy (Swedish: Örlogsmän), 1943
 In Darkest Smaland (Swedish: I mörkaste Småland), 1943
 The Royal Hunt, (Swedish: Kungajakt), 1944 
 The People of Hemsö (Swedish: Hemsöborna), 1944
 With You in My Arms (Swedish: Med dej i mina arma), 1945

References

External links

Emil Fjellström at the Svensk Filmdatabas

1884 births
1944 deaths
Swedish male stage actors
Swedish male film actors
Swedish male silent film actors
People from Östersund
20th-century Swedish male actors